Oystershell NV is a Belgian pharmaceutical laboratory based in Merelbeke for over-the-counter products.

History 

Established in 1979 in Flanders, Belgium, Oystershell was originally a miller of oyster calcium carbonate for laying hens. In the 1980s it gradually evolved from this agricultural background to veterinary medicines. Since a management buy-out in 2002 it is owned by the current management and the biotech investor Rudi Mariën.  The company is primarily involved in over the counter drugs and health products as medical devices, biocides, cosmetics and food supplements.

Products and patents 

The product innovation focus of the company lies with health products in the market segments of dermatology, cough and cold, gastro-intestinal and insect treatment (head lice, insect repellents).

Footnotes

Pharmaceutical companies of Belgium
Chemical companies of Belgium
Research institutes in Belgium
Pharmaceutical companies established in 1979
Flanders
Medical and health organisations based in Belgium
Companies based in East Flanders